Cayo Santa María (Saint Mary Cay or "Key") is an island off Cuba's north central coast in the Jardines del Rey archipelago. The island is linked by road and bridge to the town of Caibarién on the main island. Cayo Santa María is well known for its white sand beaches and luxury all-inclusive resorts.

The name "Cayo Santa María" is also used to refer to the whole resort area, comprising a chain of three islands connected by the causeway

Geography
The island is linked to the mainland near Caibarién by a 48 km causeway constructed between 1989 and 1999 by Campaña de Las Villas. The island is administered as part of Caibarién, a municipality of Villa Clara Province.

See also
Cayo Caiman Grande de Santa María Lighthouse

References

External links

Cayo Santa Maria, Cuba 
Canadians Answer Cuba's Call by Joseph Kula, Canwest, September 14, 2009
Hotels, Weather, Map and more about Cayo Santa Maria.

Santa Maria
Populated places in Villa Clara Province
Caibarién